Ramachandran Nagaswamy (10 August 1930 – 23 January 2022) was an Indian historian, archaeologist and epigraphist who was known for his work on temple inscriptions and art history of Tamil Nadu. He was an authority on Chola bronzes. 

Nagaswamy became the inaugural director of the Tamil Nadu Archaeology Department in 1966, serving in that capacity till 1988. He also founded the annual Chidambaram Natyanjali festival in 1980. In 2018, he was awarded India's third-highest civilian award, the Padma Bhushan.

Early life 

Nagaswamy was born on 10 August 1930, the son of Sanskrit pandit Ramachandran Sastrigal. He graduated in Sanskrit from the University of Madras and pursued a master's degree in Sanskrit. Nagaswamy obtained his PhD in arts and archaeology from the University of Poona. Nagaswamy underwent archaeological training under the Archaeological Survey of India (ASI) and in 1959, joined the Government Museum, Chennai as curator for art and archaeology.

Career 

Nagaswamy served as curator for art and archaeology in the Government Museum in Chennai from 1959 to 1963. In 1963, he was appointed assistant special officer for archaeology for Tamil Nadu state and from 1966 to 1988, he headed the newly formed Tamil Nadu Archaeology Department as its first director, serving until his retirement.

Nagaswamy made archaeology a popular subject in Tamil Nadu, especially among children through publication of pocket book guides. He was responsible for involving several thousand school and college students in cleaning and preserving nearby historical places and monuments. He also popularized monuments by bringing out popular guides in the form of newspaper, priced at ten paise per copy. He was responsible for protecting several historic monuments like the first-century Chera inscriptions at Pugalur, the palace site of the Imperial Cholas at Gangaikonda Cholapuram, the famous 17th-century Thirumalai Nayak palace at Madurai, the 17th-century Danish Fort at Tranquebar, and the birthplace of poet Subramania Bharati at Ettayapuram besides excavating the palace site of Virapandya Kattabomman at Panchalankurichi. He also led the first under-sea survey in Tamil Nadu when he surveyed the region off the Poompuhar coast in Mayiladuthurai.

Nagaswamy composed dance dramas chronicling the lives of the Chola rulers Raja Raja Chola and Rajendra Chola I, and the poets Arunagirinathar, Manimekhala, and Appar. He wrote on South Indian works and statues and was considered an authority on Chola bronze statues. He founded the annual Chidambaram Natyanjali festival in 1980.

Honours 
Nagaswamy was awarded the Kalaimamani award by the Government of Tamil Nadu for his work on Sekkilar's Periyapuranam. He appeared as an expert witness in the London High Court, in the "London Nataraja case" in the 1980s, which resulted in a Chola-era Nataraja statue that had been smuggled to London being returned to India.

Nagaswamy was awarded India's third highest civilian honour, the Padma Bhushan, in 2018.

Controversies 
Nagaswamy had been accused of indulging in Brahminical Sanskrit interpretation of Tamil history. He stressed that the Tamil work Thirukkural was an "abridgement" of the Hindu shastras, thereby inviting criticism from Tamil nationalists and politicians from Dravidian parties. When the Government of India proposed Nagaswamy's candidature for the Central Institute of Classical Tamil, Dravida Munetra Kazhagam leader M. K. Stalin opposed the proposal.

Personal life 
Nagaswamy was married to Parvathi with whom he had two sons and two daughters. He died at his home in Besant Nagar, Chennai, on 23 January 2022, at the age of 91.

Publications 

 
 
 
 
 
 
 Nagaswamy, R. (2018). Thirukkural: An Abridgement of Sastras. Giri Trading Agency.

Explanatory notes

References

External links 

 

1930 births
2022 deaths
20th-century Indian archaeologists
20th-century Indian linguists
Historians of Indian art
Indian archaeologists
Indian art historians
Indian epigraphers
20th-century Indian historians
Recipients of the Padma Bhushan in other fields
Scientists from Tamil Nadu
Tamil history
21st-century Indian historians